The Djibouti Party for Development is a political party in Djibouti, led by Mohamed Daoud Chehem. In the parliamentary election held on 10 January 2003, the party was part of the Union for a Democratic Change (Union pour l'Alternance Démocratique), which won 37.3% of the popular vote but no seats in the National Assembly. It is also aligned with the Union for National Salvation.

Political parties in Djibouti